Nelson Felix Patrick Weiper (born 17 March 2005) is a German professional footballer who plays as a forward for Mainz 05.

Club career
Weiper is a product of the youth academy of Mainz 05, having joined as a U8. Working his way up all their youth categories, he signed a professional contract with the club on 18 March 2022. He made his senior and Bundesliga as a late substitute with Mainz in a 2–1 loss to Freiburg on 1 October 2022. He won the 2022 U17 Fritz Walter Medal, and award for the most outstanding German youth prospect in their age group.

International career
Weiper is a youth international for Germany, having played for the Germany U17s and U18s. He was prolific with the U17s, scoring 13 goals in 15 games.

Personal life
Weiper was born in Germany to a German father and Albanian mother. His brother, Henrik, is also a footballer and youth international for Albania and Kosovo.

Honours
Individual
Fritz Walter Medal U17 Gold: 2022

References

External links
 Profile at the 1. FSV Mainz 05 website 
 
 
 Bundesliga profile

2005 births
Living people
German people of Albanian descent
Sportspeople from Mainz
German footballers
Association football midfielders
Germany youth international footballers
Bundesliga players
Regionalliga players
1. FSV Mainz 05 players
1. FSV Mainz 05 II players